Myroslav Dykun (born 24 October 1982 in Ukraine) is a Ukrainian born British amateur wrestler in the Greco-Roman and freestyle disciplines, most notable for his gold medal in the 2010 Commonwealth Games. Dykun moved to England in 2003.
He switched from freestyle to Greco-Roman in early 2010 after winning two British titles in the former discipline.

In 2012 Dykun tested positive in a drugs test and was given a two-year ban.

References

1982 births
Commonwealth Games gold medallists for England
Dykun, Myroslav
Living people
Place of birth missing (living people)
Doping cases in wrestling
Wrestlers at the 2010 Commonwealth Games
British male sport wrestlers
Commonwealth Games medallists in wrestling
Medallists at the 2010 Commonwealth Games